The Lviv Oblast Council or Lviv Regional Council is the regional council (parliament) of the Lviv Oblast (region) located in western Ukraine.

Legislative framework 
The Regional Council is a local self-government body representing the common interests of territorial communities of villages, towns and cities within the powers defined by the Constitution of Ukraine and Ukrainian Law On Local Self-Government in Ukraine.

Composition and work procedure 
The Lviv Regional Council consists of 84 members who are elected by Lviv Region residents on the basis of universal, equal and direct suffrage. Council members are elected for a five year term. In order to gain representation in the Council, a party must gain more than 5 percent of the total vote.

The Council meets in regular and extraordinary sessions. The session is plenipotentiary if more than a half of its members (at least 43) participate in the meeting.

Recent elections

2020
Distribution of seats after the 2020 Ukrainian local elections

Election date was 25 October 2020

2015
Distribution of seats after the 2015 Ukrainian local elections

Election date was 25 October 2015

References

Council
Regional legislatures of Ukraine
Unicameral legislatures